Dzięcioł is a Polish comedy movie released in 1971. The movie was directed by Jerzy Gruza.

Cast 

Wiesław Gołas as Stefan Walder
Wiesław Michnikowski as Warsaw citizen
Irena Kwiatkowska as Nurse
Alina Janowska as Miśka, as Stefan's wife
Joanna Jędryka as Irena, Stefan's friend
 Helena Bystrzanowska as Klara, Irena's aunt
Kazimierz Rudzki as Doctor in the shop
Adam Pawlikowski as Thief in the shop and party
Alfred Łodziński as Seweryn, father of Irena
Viloetta Villas as Madam Tylska
Zdzisław Maklakiewicz as Zdzisław
Władysław Hańcza as Maksymilian

External links

Dzięcioł on Filmweb.pl (Polish)
Dzięcioł on Filmpolski (Polish)

Polish comedy films
1970s Polish-language films
1971 films
1971 comedy films